Oleg Vasilyevich Dolmatov (Russian: Олег Васильевич Долматов; born 29 November 1948 in Chelyabinsk-40) is a Russian football manager and a former player.

Honors 
 Soviet Top League winner: 1976 (spring)
 Soviet Cup winner: 1977
 UEFA Euro 1972 runner-up
 Top 33 players year-end list: 1971, 1973
 UEFA Cup Winners' Cup finalist: 1972

As a coach 
 Russian Premier League runner-up: 1998
 Russian Premier League bronze: 1999

International career
Dolmatov made his debut for USSR on 18 September 1971 in a friendly against India. He earned 14 caps for the USSR national football team, and participated in UEFA Euro 1972. He also played in one qualifier game for the 1978 FIFA World Cup.

External links
Profile 

1948 births
Living people
Russian footballers
Soviet footballers
Soviet Union international footballers
UEFA Euro 1972 players
Soviet Top League players
FC Yenisey Krasnoyarsk players
FC Dynamo Moscow players
Soviet football managers
Russian football managers
FC Dynamo Stavropol managers
FC Chernomorets Novorossiysk managers
PFC CSKA Moscow managers
FC Kuban Krasnodar managers
FC Dynamo Saint Petersburg managers
FC Vorskla Poltava managers
Russian expatriate football managers
Expatriate football managers in Ukraine
FC Shinnik Yaroslavl managers
FC Lokomotiv Moscow managers
FC Rostov managers
Russian Premier League managers
Expatriate football managers in Georgia (country)
FC Khimki managers
Association football midfielders
People from Ozyorsk, Chelyabinsk Oblast
Sportspeople from Chelyabinsk Oblast